In-Chul Baek (born December 20, 1961) is a South Korean former professional boxer who competed from 1980 to 1990. He held the WBA super-middleweight title from 1989 to 1990.

Boxing career
Baek became a professional boxer in 1980. He won the Oriental and Pacific Boxing Federation (OPBF) light middleweight title in 1981. His first defeat came in 1983 when Sean Mannion defeated him over ten rounds in Atlantic City, New Jersey. Baek returned to Korea and continued his winning ways. His second defeat came in his next trip to the United States, when he challenged Julian Jackson for the WBA light middleweight title in 1987. Jackson knocked him out in three rounds. Baek then moved up to the middleweight division and in his next fight won the OPBF middleweight title.

On May 28, 1988, Baek won the WBA and lineal super middleweight titles by defeating Fulgencio Obelmejias by an eleventh-round knockout. He defended the title twice before losing it to Christophe Tiozzo on March 30, 1990. Baek retired after that fight.

Professional boxing record

See also
List of super middleweight boxing champions
List of WBA world champions

References

External links
 
Baek In-chul - CBZ Profile

1961 births
Living people
Super-middleweight boxers
World boxing champions
World super-middleweight boxing champions
South Korean male boxers
People from Cheonan